Jonathan Tudor "Jonny" Owen (born 4 July 1971 in Merthyr Tydfil, Mid Glamorgan) is a British producer, actor and writer who has appeared in TV shows including Shameless, Murphy's Law and My Family. Owen won a Welsh BAFTA in 2007 for the documentary The Aberfan Disaster which he co-produced with Judith Davies.

Career
In his later teens he was in the 1990s indie band The Pocket Devils as bass player and lead singer/songwriter. Signed to Sanctuary Records in the UK and Pop Music Records in the US they finally split after Sanctuary Records and The Pocket Devils came to a mutual termination. Owen landed the part of Richey in the Welsh drama series Nuts and Bolts in 1999.

From Nuts and Bolts he landed parts in UK Network series including Murphy's Law with James Nesbitt and Dirty Work with Neil Pearson. His meeting with Irvine Welsh when filming the Gene video "Is it over?" proved pivotal in Owen's career. He has since worked with Welsh (and his writing partner Dean Cavanagh) on several dramas including Dose for the BBC, Wedding Belles for C4 and Good Arrows for ITV (which Owen also produced).

His 2006 film Little White Lies won several film festival awards and was featured at the Moscow Film Festival. He played a BNP thug, receiving positive reviews. In 2007 he appeared as Banana Boat in Russell T Davies's Torchwood.

Owen has also worked extensively as a writer and producer for ITV Wales, including winning the Gwyn Alf Williams Award at the Welsh BAFTAs for the 40th anniversary documentary of the Aberfan disaster. It was revealed during shooting that Owen's father had been one of the first Welsh miners on the scene in the recovery operation.

Owen also did a piece for Cardiff City's appearance in the FA Cup final for Match of the Day in 2008. It received positive reviews in the media (The Guardian said it was the best part of the day's coverage) apart from the football and from football fans across the country.

In 2009 Owen appeared as regular character Ady in Channel 4's Shameless, and continued in the role in 2010.

2009 also saw the release of the independent film A Bit of Tom Jones?, with Owen in the lead role. The film spread from a limited release in Wales to being shown in selected markets throughout the UK by Vue.

He is the writer and creator of Svengali, a cult internet series which the Evening Standard and NME called 'the best series on the net'. He plays the manager of an up-and-coming band. It is based on his experiences in the music industry to the point that he named the character 'Choop' after the manager of his own band. The female lead is played by Smack the Ponys Sally Phillips. Former Creation Records head Alan McGee plays the Svengali whom 'Dixie' pursues in an effort to get the band he manages signed.

In 2013 Svengali was turned into a feature-length film, directed by John Hardwick and written by Jonny Owen. The film stars Owen, Martin Freeman, Vicky McClure, Matt Berry, Michael Socha, Michael Smiley and Natasha O'Keeffe, and is the debut release from Root Films. It was selected to show at the 67th Edinburgh International Film Festival. It was also nominated for the Michael Powell Award, a prize which honours the best British feature film.

Owen has written for The Guardian, Telegraph, Metro and Western Mail. He also was the voice for ITV Wales's Soccer Sunday programme from 2002 to 2008 and did weekly reports from France for ITV during the 2007 Rugby World Cup.

In 2014 he played in the new Jack Thornes' series Glue on E4.

On 10 March 2018, Owen was appointed as a director at Nottingham Forest F.C. to control the club's media output and video production, having previously directed the 2015 film I Believe In Miracles chronicling Forest's glory years under Brian Clough in the 1970s and 80s.

Personal life
When Owen was a teenager, he was a Welsh Boys Club Boxing champion.

Owen lives with his partner, actress Vicky McClure, in Nottingham where he relocated to live nearer her family. As of 2017 they are engaged.

He is a director of Nottingham Forest Football Club.

He has one child from his first marriage; his daughter, Katie Owen, is a DJ and cites her father as being the influence behind her career.

Filmography

TV
 Glue
 Shameless
 Svengali
 This Is England '90
 Torchwood
 Wedding Belles
 Murphy's Law
 Dose
 A Mind to Kill
 Nuts and Bolts
 Soccer Sunday, ITV Wales, 2004–2008
 Soccer Special, ITV Wales, 2004–2008
 Top Sport, ITV Wales, 2004–2006
 Hot Pursuit, ITV Wales, 2002
 Rugby World Cup Special, ITV Wales, 2003
 Rugby World Cup Special, ITV Wales, 2007
 Cancer Awareness, BBC Wales, 2003

Film
 One of the Crowd
 A Bit of Tom Jones?
 Cow
 Good Arrows
 Little White Lies
 Decidedly Bloody Dodgy
 Svengali (2013)
 I Believe in Miracles (film) (director)
 Don't Take Me Home (2017)
 The Three Kings (2020)

Voice
 FA Cup Final Match of the Day, BBC Sport, 2008
 Wales the Week promos, ITV Sport, 2008
 Hospital 24/7, BBC Wales, 2008
 Aberystwyth Soccer Seven's, Sky Sports, 2005

Producer
 Svengali
 Good Arrows
 Aberfan, ITV Wales/Sky News, 2006
 The Last Miner, The Tower Colliery Story, ITV Wales, 2007
 Soccer Sunday, ITV Wales, 2004–2008
 The Story of the NHS, ITV Wales, 2008

Others
 Keane – video for the single "Atlantic", 2006

References

External links
 

1971 births
Living people
People from Merthyr Tydfil
Welsh male film actors
Welsh film producers
Welsh male television actors
Welsh television producers
Nottingham Forest F.C. non-playing staff